Eiras e São Paulo de Frades (officially União das Freguesias de Eiras e São Paulo de Frades) is a civil parish in the municipality of Coimbra, Portugal. The population in 2011 was 17,921, in an area of 24.78 km2. It was formed on 28 January 2013 by the merging of freguesias Eiras and São Paulo de Frades.

References 

Freguesias of Coimbra